The East Suffolk line is a railway in East Anglia with a long history.

Early railways
In 1836 the Eastern Counties Railway was authorised to build a line from London to Great Yarmouth (known to the railway industry of the time as Yarmouth), via Colchester, Ipswich and Eye. At 126 miles this was the longest extent of a single railway authorised up to that time, and the share capital was to be £1.6 million, also a record. Construction proved to be hugely more expensive than had been contemplated, and when the line opened from London as far as Colchester in March 1843, £2.5 million had been expended to build a distance of 51 miles only, and for the time being no further construction was envisaged.

There was considerable disappointment in Ipswich, and for some time it fell to other railway companies to make progress; in the mid-1840s there was a sudden rush of railway building. Norwich was later reached by a roundabout route through Ely in 1845, by the Norfolk Railway, which also connected Yarmouth, taking a southward course through Reedham, and in 1847 the Lowestoft Railway and Harbour Company opened from Reedham to Lowestoft.

The Eastern Union Railway connected Ipswich to Colchester (and London over the Eastern Counties line) after a delay, in 1846, and with its offshoot the Ipswich and Bury Railway, the EUR reached Norwich via Diss in 1849. Notwithstanding its earlier failure to complete its first line, the ECR considered itself to have primacy in building a railway network in the area, and it regarded the Eastern Union Railway as an interloper; the ECR engaged in some dubious obstructionism in a hostile relationship.

First steps into East Suffolk delayed
A large tract of territory between Ipswich and Lowestoft remained unconnected to the growing railway network, and the route to London from Lowestoft and also Yarmouth was circuitous. The Eastern Union Railway opened a line from Colchester to Ipswich in 1846, and its ally the Ipswich and Bury Railway obtained Parliamentary authority to build a branch from Ipswich to Woodbridge by an Act of 1847, authorising share capital of £200,000. At the time Woodbridge was a port served by sea-going shipping. The Ipswich and Bury Railway was absorbed by the Eastern Union Railway in the same year, but the slump following the Railway Mania meant that money was very difficult to come by, and the EUR delayed making a start on construction. The EUR had to obtain an extension of time in 1851; there was considerable dissatisfaction in Woodbridge with the EUR's delay. In fact none of this line was opened during the independent existence of the Eastern Union Railway.

Halesworth, Beccles and Haddiscoe Railway
The I&BR and the EUR planned to reach Woodbridge from the south, at Ipswich, but now there came on the scene a proposed line from the north: the Halesworth, Beccles and Haddiscoe Railway was authorised on 5 June 1851; share capital was to be £150,000. The line was to run from Haddiscoe, on the Reedham to Lowestoft line, via Beccles and on to Halesworth, where it was expected to connect in to the Eastern Union Railway Woodbridge branch.

Colonel Yolland inspected the line on 14 September 1854 for the Board of Trade inspection necessary for passenger operation. However he found a number of detailed shortcomings and for the time being he declined permission to open for passenger operation. With the shortcomings attended to, the East Suffolk Railway opened the line from Haddiscoe to Halesworth to goods on 20 November 1854, and to passengers on 4 December 1854. The new company had made arrangements with the Norfolk Railway to work the line, but by the time the line was ready, the Eastern Counties Railway was working the Norfolk Railway, and therefore took over the working. The receipts of the company to 30 June 1855 were £2,168 giving a profit of £528.
At this time the company offered to sell its line to the larger Eastern Counties Railway, but at a meeting of ECR shareholders on 13 July 1855, the offer was turned down.

The first trains ran between Haddiscoe station on the Norwich to Lowestoft line, and Halesworth. There were five trains daily, calling at all stations; the journey time was 45 minutes, reduced to 40 minutes the following year. No trains ran on Sundays.

Decision to extend to Ipswich
By 1852 it was clear that the EUR would not be building its Woodbridge branch soon. The HB&HR saw that a southern termination at Woodbridge was insufficient, and it decided to build the line on from Woodbridge to Ipswich itself. The route was initially proposed to run by way of Framlingham, an important local town, but the Duke of Hamilton objected, as it would cross his land, and, he felt, diminish his enjoyment of it. The HB&HR obtained an Act authorising the extension on 3 July 1854 (before its first line was open), and the act authorised the company to change its name to the East Suffolk Railway. Its authorised capital was increased to £450,000 (from the £150,000 of the HB&HR). Branches were included in the act, to Leiston, Snape Bridge, and Framlingham. The Eastern Counties Railway had vigorously opposed the Bill, seeing that it would abstract traffic from its own network, but as it observed that the Parliamentary process was moving towards approval of what became the East Suffolk Railway, the ECR adopted a more conciliatory stance. The shift of position resulted in the ECR agreeing to work the line.

Construction of the extension
The HB&HR had been built as a single line, with (at first) purely local aspirations. Now that it was to be a through route to Ipswich, the company decided to double the line; in addition connections were to be made with other local railways, and the decision was taken to close the line temporarily to enable the work to take place. The service was suspended after 15 July 1858 and a replacement horse bus service was introduced. Sir Samuel Morton Peto, baronet became the dominant shareholder as well as the contractor for the construction of the line. He lived in Somerleyton Hall.

Lowestoft and Beccles Railway
In 1855 Lowestoft traffic to London went via Norwich in a northward sweep. Noting the construction of the HB&HR, Lowestoft people gave thought to a southward connection to that line, and at a meeting held on 26 October 1855 they determined to make a railway themselves, connecting to the HB&HR at Beccles. The Lowestoft terminus of the line was planned to be near to St John's church in South Lowestoft. As a result, the Lowestoft and Beccles Railway got its authorising Act of Parliament on 23 June 1856; authorised share capital was £80,000.

The East Suffolk (Branch and Capital) Act of 28 June 1858 enabled the company to build a connecting line to reach the existing Lowestoft (later Central) station, by building an access viaduct over Lake Lothing near Mutford Bridge, the body of water that separates the north and south parts of Lowestoft. The authorised extra capital for this was only £10,000 although it included a swing bridge.

The Lowestoft and Beccles Railway and the East Suffolk Railway amalgamated by Act of 23 July 1858; the Beccles to Lowestoft line, now effectively a branch of the East Suffolk Railway, was opened as a single line on 1 June 1859. It left the Yarmouth main line immediately north of Beccles.

Yarmouth and Haddiscoe Railway
In 1855 Yarmouth traffic to London was still going by way of Ely, a considerable detour. Yarmouth business people met on 10 November 1855, and determined to build a seven-mile line from Yarmouth to the HB&HR. When, as they expected, the Eastern Union Railway connected to the HB&HR at Woodbridge, they would have a direct route to London.

Their determination resulted in the Yarmouth and Haddiscoe Railway, which was authorised on 7 July 1856. Prominent among the promoters was Samuel Morton Peto who had designs on creating a railway from London to Norfolk to rival the Eastern Counties Railway, by a chain of local schemes. The Y&HR was to connect with the East Suffolk Railway at Haddiscoe, and there were to be dock branches at Yarmouth; the main terminal there was later named Yarmouth South Town.

In fact the company was absorbed by the East Suffolk Railway on 23 July 1858, before the line was completed: opening took place on 1 June 1859.

Sir Samuel Morton Peto
Sir Samuel Morton Peto had business interests in Lowestoft, and could see that the East Suffolk Railway would give a much more direct route from Lowestoft to London than the existing route by way of Norwich. He subscribed heavily in the ESR Woodbridge Extension after the 1854 Act and in fact became the principal shareholder. He planned to work the line when it was ready. The line was leased to Peto between 1855 and 1861, but not worked by him.

He also had an interest in the Yarmouth and Haddiscoe Railway and the Lowestoft and Beccles Railway, and in 1856 both of these lines accepted Peto's offer to lease them. Peto showed his hand when he proposed a railway from Pitsea to Colchester. Pitsea was on the London, Tilbury and Southend Railway, in which Peto also had an interest, and it was now clear that the plan was a line independent of the Eastern Counties Railway from London to Lowestoft and Yarmouth. In fact this did not come about; the new line would have been extremely expensive. Nevertheless, Peto controlled or heavily influenced the ESR and both the Lowestoft and Yarmouth companies, and he was instrumental in bringing about the amalgamation of the three lines.

Between 1855 and 1861 the line was leased to Peto.

Full opening
Accordingly the East Suffolk Railway, the Lowestoft and Beccles Railway, and the Lowestoft and Haddiscoe Railway amalgamated on 23 July 1858, under the name of the East Suffolk Railway. Captain H W Tyler of the Board of Trade made the necessary inspection for passenger operation on 7 March 1859; however there were a number of technical shortcomings, and the Board of Trade had received no undertaking as to the method of operation of the line. Moreover, some of the cast iron underbridge beams were not considered adequately strong, so the approval was withheld. Tyler revisited the line on 5 May, after a rather defensive statement had been put out by the company's engineer, George Berkly:

Captain Tyler has to-day seen that the slight alterations he required to be made to some of the signals have been completed. You are aware that these alterations were made nearly two months since, but [we] waited till he was in the neighbourhood inspecting the line from Ipswich to Woodbridge before they could conveniently be seen by Captain Tyler.

The same edition of the newspaper published disgruntled letters from shareholders complaining about the delay in opening. Finally on 27 May 1859 the company announced that the entire East Suffolk Railway line would open on 1 June 1859.

He inspected again on 5 May 1859, and this time he was satisfied with the technical issues. The company had indicated that the line would be operated by the one engine in steam system.

The combined network opened on 1 June 1859; together the three railways (ESR, L&BR and Y&HR) had cost £907,401. It ran from East Suffolk Junction, immediately north of Ipswich, to Yarmouth, using the station there later known as Yarmouth South Town. In addition the branch lines were opened on the same day: the Framlingham branch, the short goods-only Snape branch line and a branch to Leiston.) The line was worked by the Eastern Counties Railway. At Leiston a standard gauge tramway extended from the terminus to Garrett's works there.

The Ipswich Journal of 4 June 1859 reported on the opening on the official opening day:

Opening of the East Suffolk Railway: Whatever may have been the delays from time to time in completing this line of railway, and from whatever causes they may have arisen, we are glad to state that all difficulties have at length been overcome, and that the whole has been thrown open to the public; and a most excellent line it is. It consists of a main line between Ipswich and Yarmouth (53 miles in length), with branches to Framlingham, Leiston. Snape, and Lowestoft.

The Snape Bridge branch led to Newson Garrett's maltings there. The attraction of Leiston was an engineering works there run by Richard Garrett, with a considerable output, but it was quickly decided to extend to Aldeburgh (then spelt Aldeborough). The extension was authorised on 19 April 1859; the additional capital for this was £40,000, bringing the East Suffolk Railway capital to £1.02 million. Captain Tyler carried out the Board of Trade inspection on 6 April 1860, so that the Aldeburgh branch line opened on 12 April 1860.

There was a tragic accident at Framlingham on the opening day: at 1.10 pm a porter there, Edward Plantin, stepped in front of an arriving train and was badly injured; he died the following day. His duties included the uncoupling of the engine on arrival, and it seems he was too hasty in getting into position. He was leader of the town band that had been arranged for the celebrations that evening, and these were cancelled as a mark of respect.

First train services
On weekdays there were four trains per day from Ipswich. They called at all stations, and divided at Beccles with one portion for Great Yarmouth and the other for Lowestoft. In the opposite direction trains combined at Beccles for the onward journey to Ipswich. There were two trains each way on Sundays. The printed timetables showed a station at Snape Junction, which was never built.

The Snape branch was served by one of the goods trains on the main line.

Amalgamated to form the Great Eastern Railway
The ECR was gradually taking control of nearly all the railways in the area, and the value of remaining independent, while not actually operating or improving the railway, seemed insignificant. Accordingly, the idea of an amalgamation of all the affected railways met with general approval. This led to an application to Parliament in 1862 to authorise the creation of a new Company, the Great Eastern Railway, which would take over the independent concerns. The proposal gained the Royal Assent on 7 August 1862, effective from July 1862.

The ESR shareholders got £340,000 in GER 4% debentures and 3335,000 in 4.5% preference shares.

Waveney Valley Railway
The Waveney Valley Railway had been authorised in 1851 to build from Tivetshall on the Eastern Union Railway main line between Ipswich and Norwich, to Bungay. In 1853 it was granted authority to extend eastwards to Beccles, and at the time it appeared that this would be a further useful outlet for the traffic of the East Suffolk Railway. However the Waveney Valley company took some time to complete the line: it was not until 2 March 1863 that Beccles was reached, and by that time under the ownership of the Great Eastern Railway.

Train services in the period 1862–1900
In its first year of operation the Great Eastern Railway operated a through train to London (Bishopsgate station was the London terminal at the time) calling at all stations to Ipswich, then Manningtree, Colchester, Marks Tey, Witham, Chelmsford and Stratford. The following year a 10.00 service from Bishopsgate would get passengers to Lowestoft in 3 hours 15 minutes and Great Yarmouth in 3 hours 25 minutes. After Ipswich the only call was at Beccles where the train divided into two sections for the two towns.

Considering the greater resources of the Great Eastern Railway, local people requested a passenger service to Snape. The GER considered the potential, but reckoning with the necessity to provide a dedicated service (as it was at the end of a branch line) the GER considered that there was no possibility of such a service being affordable. Local people revived the proposal in 1864, even suggesting mixed trains as an alternative to dedicated passenger trains, but this was nevertheless uneconomic and the proposal was refused.

By 1883 stopping services had increased to eight per day (dividing and joining at Beccles), and there were two or three services from Liverpool Street.

In the 1890s there was considerable development of seasonal holiday traffic to Aldeburgh.

Felixstowe branch

The Felixstowe Railway and Dock Company was launched, after a number of false starts, to connect Felixstowe to the railway network, and to develop a harbour at Felixstowe. It opened to passenger traffic on 1 May 1877, and to goods in June 1877. It made a junction with the East Suffolk line at Westerfield. Felixstowe developed steadily over the years as a shipping port, and also as a seaside resort, and the traffic to and from it placed a strain on the East Suffolk line over the shared section.

Containerisation from about 1967 encouraged a huge development, and at the present day the Port of Felixstowe is a massive container port, bringing considerable traffic to the railway.

Southwold Railway

Local people had hoped that the East Suffolk Railway would build a branch line to Southwold, but that was refused. Eventually subscriptions were raised locally to build a branch line independently, and after some deliberation the track gauge of 3 feet was chosen in the interest of economy. The line opened in 1879, and both passenger and goods traffic was operated. The non-standard gauge meant that goods had to be transshipped at Halesworth, and in time this was considered to be a limitation. Declining business resulted in the line closing on 11 April 1929.

Haddiscoe and St Olaves
When the HB&HR opened, its line was simply a southward branch at Haddiscoe, from the Lowestoft Railway and Harbour company's line from Reedham to Lowestoft. When the company closed the line to double it and connect the Lowestoft and Yarmouth line, and re-opened as the East Suffolk Railway, the junction was naturally reconfigured. The main route ran north to south from Yarmouth, crossing over the Lowestoft Railway. The two routes remained connected between Fleet Junction and Haddiscoe Yard and then also from April 1872 by a new single track connection 31 chains long between Marsh Junction and St Olaves Swing Bridge Junction.

There was a St Olaves station some distance north of the point of intersection, and a pair of stations named St Olaves Junction at the intersection, "High Level" on the East Suffolk Railway and "Low Level" on the Lowestoft Railway. They were exchange platforms only, with no access from the public road.

An east-to-north curve (Marsh Junction to Swing Bridge Junction) was opened on 1 June 1872, enabling a passenger service from Lowestoft to Yarmouth to be run. After 13 July 1903 this was used in summer only; it was closed on 8 September 1954.

In 1903, the Norfolk and Suffolk Joint Railway had been opened, providing a much shorter transit between Lowstoft and Yarmouth.

In 1904 much work was done between Reedham and Lowestoft; the line from Reedham to Marsh Junction was doubled. Brodribb amplifies:

"Meantime a new Haddisicoe station was built 700 yd on the Lowestoft side of the old, replacing the former St Olaves Junction or Herringfleet Low Level Exchange Platform, and allowing the original Haddiscoe station to close. The High Level Exchange platforms on the East Suffolk were also renamed Haddiscoe and the station opened for the public to start and finish their journeys, on 9 May 1904. New signalboxes were provided at Haddiscoe Yard, Haddiscoe Junction, Reedham Swing Bridge and Reedham station."

The track over the St Olaves swing bridge was altered to become a conventional single track instead of being gauntleted, in June 1900.

Twentieth century
With the development of seaside holidays, a new halt, Thorpeness Halt, was opened on 29 July 1914 to serve the nearby Thorpeness Holiday Village. The onset of World War I severely limited the development of Thorpeness as a holiday destination.

Full signalling had been provided at Snape from the outset; the Great Eastern decided that this was unnecessary for the terminal of a short goods-only branch, and on 23 Dec 1907 the signalling was removed.

From 1923
The Railways Act 1921 was passed by the Government, with the objective of reorganising most of the railways of Great Britain into one or other of four main groups. The Great Eastern Railway was a constituent of the new London and North Eastern Railway (LNER). This was effective from the beginning of 1923.

From June 1924 the LNER ran a passenger service named the Eastern Belle; the train was formed of Pullman cars and ran to different seaside resorts in East Anglia on successive days of the week: it was an out and back in a day service. Aldeburgh was the receiving destination of one of the services; the journey time from London was 2hrs 50 minutes. Handling a heavy train on the Aldeburgh branch was a challenge for the engine crew, and there were no turning facilities for the locomotive at Aldeburgh. In 1933 the timing was accelerated to 2hrs 15 mins. The facility was suspended on the outbreak of war in 1939.

In 1933 a siding was laid on the site of the former Southwold Railway terminus to serve the United Dairies plant at Halesworth. Milk tanks ran from Halesworth to Ilford (London) on a daily basis. The dairy closed on 30 April 1968 although rail traffic may have ceased before that date.

After the start of World War II in 1939, an emergency timetable was introduced and only eight trains a day from Ipswich to Great Yarmouth operated daily, with two on Sundays. Saxmundham acted as a railhead for 6,000 evacuees from London in the early days of the war, although with the threat of invasion in 1940 they were moved away. Because of the line's proximity to the East Anglian coast a number of armoured trains operated until 1943, when they were stood down as the threat of invasion had receded.

From 1948
In 1947 the Government once again determined to reorganise the railways compulsorily, and this time the Transport Act, 1947 moved the railway companies into national ownership, under British Railways. The LNER network became part of British Railways, and the East Suffolk network was in the Eastern Region of British Railways.

The Framlingham branch had long suffered from falling patronage, and it was closed to ordinary passenger traffic on 3 November 1952. For some years Framlingham College special trains, and also ramblers' excursions ran on the branch. The last passenger train on the Framlingham branch was a ramblers' excursion on 12 April 1963 from London Liverpool Street to Framlingham, believed to be only time a diesel locomotive worked a passenger train on the branch: D5595). Heavy grain loadings at Framlingham secured the future of the goods service for the time being, but on 19 April 1965 the branch closed completely.

The North Sea flood of 1953 on 31 January 1953 brought about track damage at Woodbridge, where the embankment was in danger of slipping, and at Melton, where the embankment was washed away.

The Waveney Valley line passenger service was withdrawn on 5 January 1953.

In 1954 there was a general acceleration of the best trains between London and Yarmouth, at 2hrs 58 minutes for 121 miles, running semi-fast from Ipswich. Additional local services were provided between Beccles and Lowestoft and Yarmouth operated by push-and-pull trains. About 25 trains ran between Ipswich and Beccles each way on summer Saturdays, many of them non-stop over that stretch. The Holiday Camps Express ran non-stop between London and Lowestoft; in the up direction the Lowestoft stop was for engine change only.

In 1955 British Railways closed Melton station and Bealings in 1956 due to insufficient patronage.

From 10 November 1956 diesel multiple unit trains were introduced on the East Suffolk line; the new diesel trains were popular, but the line was limited in its appeal because of the inconvenient location of many of the stations.

The January 1959 timetable arranged that express services on the route ran every three hours between Yarmouth (South Town) and Ipswich; they were supplemented by an hourly diesel multiple unit service, which generally ran via Gorleston and Lowestoft (reverse) to Beccles, then calling at Halesworth, Saxmundham and Woodbridge only. Minor stations were served by occasional all stations services.

On 2 November 1959 the line between Beccles and Yarmouth South Town was closed.

In the 1950s the maltings at Snape had become outdated and were losing in competition with more modern companies. Imported barley was being brought in by road and by coastal shipping, although there was some sugar beet traffic in season. Timber bridges on the branch needed replacement and modernisation required replacement of the J15 steam engines with diesels, but the diesels intended for use on the main line were too heavy for the bridges. Use of a diesel shunting engine was impracticable in view of their slow maximum speed (in reaching the location from Ipswich). This triggered closure of the line from 7 March 1960.

From 1960
In 1960 it was announced that a new nuclear power station would be constructed at Sizewell, near Leiston; there would be a considerable volume of construction materials, and much of these would be delivered by rail.

The last train operated on the Snape branch on 4 March 1960, so that the branch was officially closed on 7 March; the branch and been served by the last regular main line steam working in Suffolk.

Yarmouth expresses diverted via Norwich from 18 June 1962.

The entire East Suffolk line was listed for closure as part of the Beeching Plan of 1963. There was considerable local opposition, and on 29 June 1966 the Minister of Transport, Barbara Castle, announced that the East Suffolk main line would be retained, although the Aldeburgh line could close.

It was essential to reduce the cost of operating the line to the minimum, and this was to be done by singling the track, introducing conductor-guard operation (later named the "paytrain" system) and destaffing the stations. A revised train service was implemented on 11 November 1966, and conductor-guard operation from 10 March 1967.

The through local service Ipswich to Yarmouth via Beccles ended in November 1966.

The goods yards at Westerfield, Bealings, Wickham Market, Brampton and Oulton Broad South all closed on 13 July 1964., and the Lowestoft South Side and Kirkly goods stations closed in 1967 and 1966 respectively.

The Aldeburgh branch was closed to passenger traffic on 12 September 1966. In 1972 the junction was simplified and Saxmundham Junction signal box taken out of service.

Paytrains were introduced on 7 March 1967.

The East Suffolk line was resignalled in 1984 using the Radio Electronic Token Block resulting in the closure of all conventional signal boxes; the RETB controlling signal box was at Saxmundham.

Melton station was reopened in 1984 after a local campaign.

The Lowestoft to Yarmouth line closed on 4 May 1970.

On 26 October 1981 atomic flask traffic started running to and from the nuclear power station at Sizewell.

In 1988 the layout at Sizewell was extended so as to handle construction traffic for Sizewell B power station.

From 2000
Until October 2012, the section from Westerfield to Oulton Broad was signalled using Radio Electronic Token Block controlled from Saxmundham, and was the only line in England to use this system. However, due to radio frequency licensing issues, and the imminent beginning of an hourly train service on the line, which would have been beyond the capacity of RETB, Track Circuit Block signalling (using AzLM axle counters) has replaced the RETB system, after the last train on 19 October 2012. The new signalling came into operation on 23 October 2012, controlled from the existing signal box at Saxmundham. On 10 December 2012 a new passing loop and reinstated second platform opened at Beccles.

In December 2010 through trains from Lowestoft to London via the East Suffolk Line were terminated. From December 2012 an hourly service over the East Suffolk line was introduced following the completion of the passing loop at Beccles.

Motive power
During the steam era the only engine sheds located on the line were at Beccles and Lowestoft. Locomotives from Yarmouth South Town, Norwich and Ipswich engine sheds all worked services over the line and some express services would have been worked by locomotives from Stratford engine shed. Branch lines such as Framlingham and Aldeburgh had engine sheds for their branch locomotives.

During the steam era the majority of services would have been worked by locomotives of Great Eastern origin. These would have included:

In 1928 the London and North Eastern introduced the B17 class 4-6-0 locomotives on express workings.

After 1948 the LNER Thompson Class L1 2-6-4T was introduced (this was an LNER design built under British Railway's auspices) and saw service on the line. From 1951 the Britannia class 4-6-2 locomotives worked express services.

From the late 1950s diesel locomotives started appearing on services. These included:

 British Rail Class 03 - shunting/local goods
 British Rail Class 04 - shunting/local goods
 British Rail Class 05 - shunting/local goods
 British Rail Class 15 - mixed traffic
 British Rail Class 21- mixed traffic
 British Rail Class 24- mixed traffic
 British Rail Class 31- mixed traffic
 British Rail Class 37- predominantly passenger traffic - worked through trains to London Liverpool Street until 1984.

Diesel Multiple Units took over all local stopping services on 5 January 1959 and the last steam locomotives used the line in June 1960. Several classes of DMU have worked the line including Gloucester RCW Class 100, Cravens Class 105 and for many years in the 1980s and 1990s Metropolitan Cammel Class 101 based at Norwich depot. The latter operated as a small dedicated fleet equipped with radio signalling equipment. An experimental railbus, LEV1, was employed on the East Suffolk for two months in 1980. Eventually more modern types of DMU operated the line with Class 150s running East Suffolk line services.

References

Notes

Citations

Bibliography

East Suffolk Line
Railway lines in the East of England
Rail transport in Suffolk